The Bridge in Gibson Borough near South Gibson, Pennsylvania was a stone false arch bridge over Bell Creek, north of its confluence with Tunkhannock Creek. It was constructed sometime between 1750 and 1824 and listed on the National Register of Historic Places in 1988.

The bridge was a type of false arch clapper bridge or stone slab bridge on corbelled stone supports. From the corners of the wing walls it measured 58 by 25 feet.

It was located in Gibson Township, Susquehanna County, Pennsylvania north of the unincorporated town of South Gibson. The meaning of "Gibson Borough" in the National Register listing is unclear.

The bridge was reported as "demolished" to the Pennsylvania Historical and Museum Commission in December 2015.

References

Bridges in Susquehanna County, Pennsylvania
Road bridges on the National Register of Historic Places in Pennsylvania
National Register of Historic Places in Susquehanna County, Pennsylvania
Stone arch bridges in the United States